Wilson may refer to:

People 
Wilson (name)
 List of people with given name Wilson
 List of people with surname Wilson
Wilson (footballer, 1927–1998), Brazilian manager and defender
Wilson (footballer, born 1984), full name Wilson Rodrigues de Moura Júnior, Brazilian goalkeeper
Wilson (footballer, born 1985), full name Wilson Rodrigues Fonseca, Brazilian forward
Wilson (footballer, born 1975), full name Wilson Roberto dos Santos, Brazilian centre-back

Places

Australia 
Wilson, South Australia
 Wilson, Western Australia
 Wilson Inlet, Western Australia
 Wilson Reef, Queensland
 Wilsons Promontory, Victoria, Australia, and hence:
Wilsons Promontory Islands Important Bird Area
Wilsons Promontory Lighthouse
Wilsons Promontory Marine National Park
Wilsons Promontory National Park

Canada 
 Wilson Avenue (Toronto), Ontario
 Wilson (TTC) subway station
 Wilson Subway Yard

Poland 
 Wilson Square (Plac Wilsona), in Warsaw

United Kingdom 
 Wilson, Leicestershire
 The Wilson (Cheltenham), Gloucestershire

United States 
 Wilson, Arkansas
 Wilson, Indiana
 The Wilson (Indianapolis, Indiana), listed on the NRHP in Indiana
 Wilson, Kansas
 Wilson, Louisiana
 Wilson (town), New York
 Wilson (village), New York, in the town
 Wilson, North Carolina
 Wilson, Ohio
 Wilson, Oklahoma
 Wilson, Pennsylvania
 Wilson, South Carolina
 Wilson, Texas
 Wilson, Comanche County, Texas, an unincorporated community
 Wilson, Kaufman County, Texas, an unincorporated community
 Wilson, Utah, a former unincorporated community
 Wilson, Wisconsin (disambiguation), several places
 Wilson, Wyoming
 Wilson Avenue (BMT Canarsie Line) subway station in New York City
 Mouth of Wilson, Virginia
 Mount Wilson, California

Lists of places with Wilson in the name 
 Lake Wilson (disambiguation)
 List of peaks named Mount Wilson
 Wilson County (disambiguation)
 Wilson Township (disambiguation)

Science

Botany and zoology 
 Wilson's bird-of-paradise
 Wilson's magnolia (Magnolia wilsonii)
 Wilson's phalarope
 Wilson's plover
 Wilson's snipe
 Wilson's spiny mouse
 Wilson's storm petrel
 Wilson's warbler

Medicine 
 Wilson's disease, a hereditary disease characterized by the accumulation of copper in tissue
 Wilson's temperature syndrome, a contested form of thyroid deficiency in alternative medicine circles

Physics 
 Wilson action, lattice discretization of gauge fields
 Wilson loop, loop operator in quantum field theory

Companies 
 Wilson (company), Norwegian shipping company
 Wilson Combat, American firearms company
 Wilson's (Mint Cake), one of three companies that manufacture Kendal mint cake
 Wilson Parking, Hong Kong-based car parking management company
 Wilson Security, Australian private security company
 Wilson Sporting Goods, American sports equipment manufacturer
 H. J. Wilson Co., aka Wilson's, a defunct catalog showroom chain
 O. G. Wilson, a defunct catalog showroom chain owned by Zale Corporation
Wilson's (department store), a department store in Massachusetts
 Wilson's Leather

Fictional characters 
 Sergeant Arthur Wilson, from the TV show Dad's Army
 Wilson (Home Improvement), from the TV show Home Improvement
 James Wilson (House), from the TV show House
 George Everett Wilson, from the comic strip Dennis the Menace
 Wilson the Wonder Athlete, from the British story papers and comics published by D.C. Thomson & Co.
 Wilson the Volleyball, from the film Cast Away
 Wilson, king in the Gamehendge saga by the rock band Phish
 Wilson, a red diesel engine from the TV series  Chuggington
 Wilson, the main character from the video game Don't Starve
 Wilson, the dog of Jim in Friday Night Dinner

Other uses 
 Wilson (1944 film), a biographical film about Woodrow Wilson
 Wilson (2017 film), a film directed by Craig Johnson, based on Daniel Clowes's graphic novel
 Wilson (band), an American rock band
 Wilson (book), a 2013 biography of Woodrow Wilson by A. Scott Berg
 Wilson (comics), a 2010 graphic novel by Daniel Clowes
 Wilson (crater), a lunar crater
 "Wilson" (House episode), a television episode
 "Wilson (Expensive Mistakes)", a song by Fall Out Boy
 Wilson gearbox, or preselector gearbox
 Wilson Ornithological Society
 Wilson's School, boys' grammar school in Wallington, London, UK
 Wilson, the nickname of the first deployment of The Ocean Cleanup
 Wilson score

See also

Justice Wilson (disambiguation)
Willson (disambiguation)
Wilson College (disambiguation)
Wilson Creek (disambiguation)
Wilson Lake (disambiguation)
Wilsonville (disambiguation)
Wilson's theorem in mathematics